Vingnes is a village in Lillehammer Municipality in Innlandet county, Norway. The village is located on the west bank of lake Mjøsa, just across the Gudbrandsdalslågen river from the town of Lillehammer. The European route E6 highway runs through the village.

References

Lillehammer
Villages in Innlandet
Populated places on the Gudbrandsdalslågen